Professor Nachtfalter is a 1951 West German comedy film directed by Rolf Meyer and starring Johannes Heesters, Jeanette Schultze and Maria Litto. The film's sets were designed by the art director Franz Schroedter. The film was made at the Bendestorf Studios and partly shot on location at Lake Constance. The film's sets were designed by the art director Franz Schroedter. It cost around 900,000 Deutschmarks to make.

Synopsis
The male music teacher at a girls boarding school is far too popular with his female students, leading to his aunt, the headmistress, ordering him to get married. While in the city he gets entangled with a nightclub singer, who then enrolls at the school pretending to be a student.

Cast

References

Bibliography 
 Bock, Hans-Michael & Bergfelder, Tim. The Concise CineGraph. Encyclopedia of German Cinema. Berghahn Books, 2009.

External links 
 

1951 films
West German films
German comedy films
1951 comedy films
1950s German-language films
Films directed by Rolf Meyer
German black-and-white films
1950s German films